Graglia is a comune (municipality) in the Province of Biella in the Italian region Piedmont, located about  northeast of Turin and about  southwest of Biella.

The communal territory includes the Mombarone peak and the Lake Ingagna. It is home to the Sacro Monte di Graglia sanctuary.

References